Government Arts College for Men, Krishnagiri, is a general degree college located in Krishnagiri, Tamil Nadu. It was established in the year 1964. The college is affiliated with Periyar University. This college offers different courses in arts, commerce and science.

Departments

Science
Physics
Chemistry
Mathematics
Botany
Zoology
Microbiology
Computer Science

Arts and Commerce
Tamil
English
Urdu
History
Economics
Business Administration
Commerce

Accreditation
The college is  recognized by the University Grants Commission (UGC).

References

External links

Educational institutions established in 1964
1964 establishments in Madras State
Colleges affiliated to Periyar University
Krishnagiri district